Melek Hassan Tourhan (27 October 1869 – 4 February 1956) was the second wife of Sultan Hussein Kamel of Egypt. After her husband ascended the throne in 1914, she became known as Sultana Melek.

Early life

Born in Istanbul in 1869, Melek was a Circassian. However, unlike many Circassians in the Ottoman era, she was not a slave. Emine Foat Tugay, whose mother Princess Nimet Mouhtar was a friend of Melek, described her as "a pocket Venus, tiny but perfectly proportioned, a pretty, lively brunette, with great charm." Tugay states in her family memoirs that "as a child [Melek] was delicate and was often sent to spend a fortnight with Neshedil Qadin [wife of Khedive Isma'il and mother of Princess Nimet] in the salubrious air of Zaaferan."

Melek's father Hasan Tourhan Pasha was a captain in the Ottoman Navy. When Melek was still an infant, he offered her for adoption in order to improve her lot in life. Melek was adopted by Jeshm Afet Hanim, the third wife of Khedive Isma'il Pasha of Egypt.

Marriage
In 1887, she married Hussein Kamel, the khedive's favorite son. She bore him three daughters: Kadria, Samiha and Badiha. Hussein Kamel was not expected to ascend the throne when Melek married him. When his eldest brother Khedive Tewfik died in 1892, he was succeeded by his son Abbas Hilmi II, who fathered two sons of his own during his reign. However, events took an unexpected turn with the outbreak of World War I. The United Kingdom, which was occupying Egypt at the time, deposed Abbas and installed his uncle Hussein Kamel as Egypt's new ruler. Hussein Kamel was given the title of Sultan of Egypt by the British in order to emphasize the end of Egypt's status as a vassal of the Ottoman Sultan. As a result, Melek received the title of Sultana. Hussein Kamel invented for himself and his wife the style of Hautesse, which can be translated into English as Gloriness.

Hussein Kamel was a family man who treated Melek with respect and devotion. During his reign, Melek kept a low profile. In keeping with the other royal consorts who preceded her, she attended performances at the Khedivial Opera House, although she was seated in a box separated from the rest of the audience by a Mashrabiya.

Widowhood
When Hussein Kamel died in 1917, his only surviving son Prince Kamal el Dine Hussein (born of a previous marriage) renounced his succession rights, and so the throne went to Hussein Kamel's brother Fuad. On 11 October 1917, only two days after his ascension to the throne, Fuad issued a rescript allowing Melek to keep her sultanic title. When a formal order of precedence was established for the Kingdom of Egypt in 1932, he issued another rescript whereby Melek was placed second only to Queen Nazli in the order of precedence, and before all the other princesses of the Royal Family. By then, Melek was considered the Sultana, while Nazli was considered the Queen. As a widow, Melek was no longer secluded but was visible at official occasions and photographs, such at the wedding between King Farouk in 1938. In 1923, along with Crown Prince Leopold and Queen Elisabeth of Belgium, Melek visited the newly discovered tomb of Tutankhamun in Luxor. The Western press of the time often referred to her as the Dowager Sultana, a title that carried no legal standing in Egypt.

Melek never remarried and spent her four decades of widowhood travelling with her slaves to Europe, Lebanon and Luxor. Her title stayed as Sultana even after the coronation of King Farouk I. Her principal residence was her palace in the Cairo suburb of Heliopolis, opposite the famous Villa Baron Empain. Historian Samir Raafat describes the widowed Melek as an "aging Sultana [who] held an outdated a-la-Turca court in her zany Heliopolis palace."

Death
Melek died in Cairo on 4 February 1956, having witnessed the 1952 Revolution and the ensuing abolition of the monarchy.

Honours
  Decoration of Al Kemal in brilliants (Egypt, 1915).

See also
List of consorts of the Muhammad Ali Dynasty

References

Bibliography

External links

 

19th-century Egyptian women
20th-century Egyptian women
1869 births
1956 deaths
Adoptees
Burials in Egypt
Egyptian royal consorts
Muhammad Ali dynasty
People from the Ottoman Empire of Circassian descent